Konojady  is a village in the administrative district of Gmina Jabłonowo Pomorskie, within Brodnica County, Kuyavian-Pomeranian Voivodeship, in north-central Poland.

Notable residents
Gero Bisanz (1935 - 2014), German football coach

References

Konojady